The Houston Rockets are an American professional basketball franchise based in Houston, Texas. The team plays in the Southwest Division of the Western Conference in the National Basketball Association (NBA). The team was established in 1967, and played in San Diego, California for four years, before relocating to Houston. They have made the playoffs in 25 of their 42 seasons, and won their division and conference four times each; they also won back-to-back NBA championships in 1994 and 1995. They won 22 straight games during the  season, the third-longest streak in NBA history.

Hakeem Olajuwon, the NBA Finals Most Valuable Player in both of the Rockets' championship seasons, played for the Rockets for 17 years and is the career leader for the franchise in 9 categories. He also holds the NBA records for blocks in a playoff game and most points and blocks in a 4-game playoff series. Moses Malone, who played 6 of 19 seasons for the Rockets, had the most points, rebounds, and free throws made in a season for the Rockets, and he also holds the NBA records for most offensive rebounds in a regular season and playoff game.

The individual player records section lists the Rockets career leaders in major statistical categories, as well as franchise records for single seasons and games. The team section lists the Rockets' teams that have recorded the highest and lowest totals in a category in a single season and game, and any NBA records that the Rockets have set as a team.

Individual records

Franchise leaders 
Bold denotes still active with team.

Italic denotes still active but not with team. Points scored (regular season)

(as of the end of the 2020–21 season)
 1. Hakeem Olajuwon (26,511)
 2. James Harden (18,365)
 3. Calvin Murphy (17,949)
 4. Rudy Tomjanovich (13,383) 
 5. Elvin Hayes (11,762)
 6. Moses Malone (11,119)

 7. Yao Ming (9,247)
 8. Robert Reid (8,823)
 9. Mike Newlin (8,480)
 10. Otis Thorpe (8,177)
 11. Cuttino Mobley (7,448)
 12. Steve Francis (7,281)

 13. Tracy McGrady (6,888)
 14. Allen Leavell (6,684)
 15. Vernon Maxwell (6,002)
 16. Ralph Sampson (5,995)
 17. Kenny Smith (5,910)
 18. Luis Scola (5,597)

 19. Rodney McCray (5,059)
 20. Sleepy Floyd (5,030)
 21. Stu Lantz (4,947)
 22. Trevor Ariza (4,863)
 23. Eric Gordon (4,564)
 24. Lewis Lloyd (4,384)

 25. Clyde Drexler (4,155)
 26. Buck Johnson (4,139)
 27. John Block (4,138)
 28. Clint Capela (4,075)
 29. Don Kojis (4,037)
 30. John Lucas II (3,756)

Other statistics (regular season) 
(as of May 16, 2021)

Individual honors 

NBA Most Valuable Player Award
 Moses Malone – 1979, 1982
 Hakeem Olajuwon – 1994
 James Harden – 2018

NBA Finals MVP
 Hakeem Olajuwon – 1994, 1995

NBA Scoring Champions
 Elvin Hayes – 1969
 James Harden – 2018, 2019, 2020

NBA Defensive Player of the Year
 Hakeem Olajuwon – 1993, 1994

NBA Rookie of the Year
 Ralph Sampson – 1984
 Steve Francis – 2000

NBA Sixth Man of the Year
 Eric Gordon – 2017

NBA Most Improved Player
 Aaron Brooks – 2010

NBA Coach of the Year
 Tom Nissalke – 1977
 Don Chaney – 1991
 Mike D'Antoni – 2017

NBA Executive of the Year
 Ray Patterson – 1977
 Daryl Morey – 2018

J. Walter Kennedy Citizenship Award
 Calvin Murphy – 1979
 Dikembe Mutombo – 2009

NBA All-Defensive First Team
 Hakeem Olajuwon – 1987, 1988, 1990, 1993, 1994
 Rodney McCray – 1988
 Scottie Pippen – 1999
 Patrick Beverley – 2017

NBA All-Defensive Second Team
 Moses Malone – 1979
 Hakeem Olajuwon – 1985, 1991, 1996, 1997
 Rodney McCray – 1987
 Shane Battier – 2008, 2009
 Ron Artest – 2009
 Patrick Beverley – 2014

NBA All-Rookie First Team
 Elvin Hayes – 1969
 Calvin Murphy – 1971
 Joe Meriweather – 1976
 John Lucas – 1977
 Ralph Sampson – 1984
 Hakeem Olajuwon – 1985
 Steve Francis – 2000
 Yao Ming – 2003
 Luis Scola – 2008

NBA All-Rookie Second Team
 Robert Horry – 1993
 Matt Maloney – 1997
 Cuttino Mobley – 1999
 Michael Dickerson – 1999
 Eddie Griffin – 2002
 Luther Head – 2006
 Carl Landry – 2008
 Chandler Parsons – 2012

All-NBA First Team
 Moses Malone – 1979, 1982
 Hakeem Olajuwon – 1987, 1988, 1989, 1993, 1994, 1997
 James Harden – 2014, 2015, 2017, 2018, 2019, 2020

All-NBA Second Team
 Moses Malone – 1980, 1981
 Ralph Sampson – 1985
 Hakeem Olajuwon – 1986, 1990, 1996
 Yao Ming – 2007, 2009
 Tracy McGrady – 2007
 Dwight Howard – 2014

All-NBA Third Team
 Hakeem Olajuwon – 1991, 1995, 1999
 Clyde Drexler – 1995
 Yao Ming – 2004, 2006, 2008
 Tracy McGrady – 2005, 2008
 James Harden – 2013
 Russell Westbrook – 2020

All-Star
 Don Kojis – 1968, 1969
 Elvin Hayes – 1969–1972
 Jack Marin – 1973
 Rudy Tomjanovich – 1974–1977, 1979
 Moses Malone – 1978–1982
 Calvin Murphy – 1979
 Ralph Sampson – 1984–1987
 Hakeem Olajuwon – 1985–1990, 1992–1997
 Otis Thorpe – 1992
 Charles Barkley – 1997
 Clyde Drexler – 1996, 1997
 Steve Francis – 2002–2004
 Tracy McGrady – 2005–2007
 Yao Ming – 2003–2009, 2011
 James Harden – 2013–2020
 Dwight Howard – 2014
 Russell Westbrook – 2020
 Chris Paul - 2018-2019

All-Star head coach
 Rudy Tomjanovich – 1997
 Mike D'Antoni – 2018

All-Star Game MVP
 Ralph Sampson – 1985

Notes
  Shooting percentages in basketball are calculated by taking the number of field goals, three-pointers, or free throws attempted, and dividing it by the corresponding number of shots taken.
A regulation NBA game is 48 minutes long. Both games went to triple overtime.
 The record only applies for a player that had 10 or more field goal attempts in a game.
 The record only applies for a player that had 5 or more three-point field goals made in a game.
 This means that the Rockets made 61 fields goals out of 89 attempted.
 Drexler shares this record with 10 other players.
 Olajuwon shares this record with Mark Eaton.
 This record was achieved in one other game, between the New Jersey Nets and the Portland Trail Blazers.
 The Rockets share this record with the Washington Wizards.
 The Rockets share this record with the Orlando Magic (January 19, 2009)
 The Rockets share this record with the Denver Nuggets (February 13, 2017).

References
General
 
 
 
 

Specific

External links
Rockets.com Houston Rockets official site
Houston Rockets Statistics at Basketball-Reference.com

records
National Basketball Association accomplishments and records by team